The men's sanda 65 kg at the 2002 Asian Games in Busan, South Korea was held from 10 to 13 October at the Dongseo University Minseok Sports Center.

A total of ten competitors from ten different countries competed in this event, limited to fighters whose body weight was less than 65 kilograms in competition.

Angkhan Chomphuphuang from Thailand won the gold medal after beating Mohammad Aghaei of Iran in gold medal bout 2–0, The bronze medal was shared by Yu Dawei and Eduard Folayang.

Schedule
All times are Korea Standard Time (UTC+09:00)

Results
Legend
KO — Won by knockout

References

2002 Asian Games Report, Page 792
Results

External links
Official website

Men's sanda 65 kg